Dea Klein-Šumanovac (born 17 May 1981 in Zagreb, SFR Yugoslavia) is a former Croatian female professional basketball player.

External links
Profile at eurobasket.com

1981 births
Living people
Basketball players from Zagreb
Croatian women's basketball players
Shooting guards
Croatian Women's Basketball League players
Mediterranean Games silver medalists for Croatia
Competitors at the 2005 Mediterranean Games
Mediterranean Games medalists in basketball